The Republic's Cup 1931 was the 31st staging of the Copa del Rey, the Spanish football cup competition.

With the proclamation of the Second Spanish Republic on April 14, all teams with "Real" ("Royal") in their names, changed it due to anti-monarchic reasons. Real Sociedad changes to Donostia FC. Most of this changes were done between first and second legs of the first round.

The competition started on April 12, 1931, and concluded on June 21, 1931, with the final, held at the Estadio Chamartín in Madrid. Athletic Bilbao won their 11th title, the second in a row.

Teams
Andalusia: Sevilla FC, Betis Balompié
Aragon: Iberia SC, Patria Aragón
Asturias: Oviedo FC, Sporting de Gijón
Balearic Islands: RCD Mallorca
Cantabria: Racing de Santander, Eclipse FC
Castile and León: Cultural y Deportiva Leonesa, Valladolid Deportivo
Catalonia: FC Barcelona, CD Sabadell, FC Badalona
Extremadura: Don Benito FC
Galicia: Celta de Vigo, Deportivo La Coruña
Gipuzkoa: Unión Club, Donostia FC, CD Logroño
Murcia: Murcia FC, Lorca FC
Center Region: Madrid CF, Athletic Madrid, Racing de Madrid
Valencia: Valencia CF, CD Castellón
Biscay: Athletic Bilbao, CD Alavés, Arenas Club

Round of 32
The first leg was played on April 12. The second leg was played on May 3.

|}
Athletic Bilbao and Sporting Gijón received a bye.

Round of 16
The first leg was played on May 10. The second leg was played on May 17.

|}
Tiebreaker
Played in Madrid on May 19.

|}

Quarter-finals
The first leg was played on May 24. The second leg was played on May 31.

|}
Tiebreaker
Played in Barcelona on June 2.

|}

Semi-finals
The first leg was played on June 7. The second leg was played on June 14.

|}
Tiebreaker
Played in Madrid on June 16.

|}

Final

References

External links
rsssf.com
 linguasport.com

1931
1931 domestic association football cups
Copa